Doneisha Anderson (born 21 September 2000) is a Bahamian athlete. She competed in the women's 4 × 400 metres relay event at the 2020 Summer Olympics. She competes at the collegiate level for the University of Florida.

References

External links
 Florida Gators bio

2000 births
Living people
Bahamian female sprinters
Athletes (track and field) at the 2020 Summer Olympics
Olympic athletes of the Bahamas
Place of birth missing (living people)
Florida Gators women's track and field athletes